Martin Malvy (born 24 February 1936) is a French politician. He is a member of the Socialist Party.

In 1992, he was the spokesmen of the French government. Between 1992 and 1993, he was Minister of Budget. He is president of the Région Midi-Pyrénées between 1998 and 2015.

References

External links
 Official website

1936 births
Living people
Politicians from Paris
Convention of Republican Institutions politicians
Socialist Party (France) politicians
French Ministers of Budget
Government spokespersons of France
Deputies of the 6th National Assembly of the French Fifth Republic
Deputies of the 7th National Assembly of the French Fifth Republic
Deputies of the 8th National Assembly of the French Fifth Republic
Deputies of the 9th National Assembly of the French Fifth Republic
Deputies of the 10th National Assembly of the French Fifth Republic
Deputies of the 11th National Assembly of the French Fifth Republic
Commanders of the Ordre national du Mérite
Officiers of the Légion d'honneur